Blantyre is one of the grand Berkshire "cottages" put up during the Gilded Age in Western Massachusetts. Built in 1902 by Robert Paterson, a wealthy New York City businessman, it is named for his mother's ancestral home in Scotland.

History 
After Paterson's death, his widow sold it in 1925, whereupon it became, among other things, a clubhouse for a golf course that had been built there. In 1938, Hollywood film director D.W. Griffith purchased the property, envisioning it might become a movie studio although that idea was never realized.

In 1944, Henry and Babette de Sola Mendes purchased Blantyre from the Lenox National Bank and transformed the property into a hotel for the area's many summer visitors, including concertgoers and performers at Tanglewood, the summer music festival which had been established in 1940. Conductor Leonard Bernstein stayed there several times. Guests also included parents of campers at Watitoh, a summer camp that the Mendes family had established in nearby Becket, Mass.

After Henry Mendes sold Blantyre in the 1960s, it passed through several hands until in 1980 it was purchased by Jack and Jane Fitzpatrick, owners of the popular Red Lion Inn in Stockbridge, Mass. The Fitzpatricks added many amenities, transforming Blantyre into a luxury resort, and their daughter, JoAnn Fitzpatrick Brown, continued in her parents' footsteps until her death in 2016.

In June 2017, Blantyre was purchased by Linda Law, a Silicon Valley entrepreneur and real estate developer, for $8 million.

References

See also
Blantyre, South Lanarkshire

Houses in Berkshire County, Massachusetts